The V1 500 metre sprint event within the Outrigger canoeing competition at the 2011 Pacific Games was won by Hans Paieamo of French Polynesia.

Heats

The V1 500 meter heat occurred on 30 August with two heats and a repechage.

Repechage

Final
The final occurred on 30 August with 6 competitors from 6 countries.

Sources

2011 Pacific Games